Ontherus is a genus of Scarabaeidae or scarab beetles in the superfamily Scarabaeoidea.

List of species

 Ontherus aequatorius Bates, 1891
 Ontherus alexis Blanchard, 1846
 Ontherus amplector Génier, 1996
 Ontherus androgynus Génier, 1996
 Ontherus aphodioides Burmeister, 1874
 Ontherus appendiculatus Mannerheim, 1829
 Ontherus ashei Génier, 1996
 Ontherus atlantidis Génier, 1996
 Ontherus azteca Harold, 1869
 Ontherus brevicollis Kirsch, 1870
 Ontherus brevipennis Harold, 1867
 Ontherus bridgesi Waterhouse, 1891
 Ontherus cambeforti Génier, 1996
 Ontherus carinicollis Luederwaldt, 1930
 Ontherus carinifrons Luederwaldt, 1930
 Ontherus cephalotes Harold, 1869
 Ontherus compressicornis Luederwaldt, 1931
 Ontherus dentatus Luederwaldt, 1930
 Ontherus diabolicus Génier, 1996
 Ontherus digitatus Harold, 1868
 Ontherus edentulus Génier, 1996
 Ontherus elegans Luederwaldt, 1930
 Ontherus erosioides Luederwaldt, 1930
 Ontherus erosus Harold, 1875
 Ontherus felicitae González & Medina, 2015
 Ontherus gilli Génier, 1996
 Ontherus gladiator Génier, 1998
 Ontherus grandis Luederwaldt, 1931
 Ontherus hadros Génier, 1996
 Ontherus howdeni Génier, 1996
 Ontherus incisus Kirsch, 1870
 Ontherus insolitus Génier, 1996
 Ontherus irinus Balthasar, 1938
 Ontherus kirschii Harold, 1867
 Ontherus laminifer Balthasar, 1938
 Ontherus lichyi Martinez, 1947
 Ontherus lobifrons Génier, 1996
 Ontherus lunicollis Génier, 1996
 Ontherus magnus Génier, 1996
 Ontherus mexicanus Harold, 1868
 Ontherus monilistriatus Génier, 1996
 Ontherus obliquus Génier, 1996
 Ontherus pilatus Génier, 1996
 Ontherus planus Génier, 1996
 Ontherus podiceps Harold, 1868
 Ontherus politus Génier, 1996
 Ontherus pseudodidymus Génier, 1996
 Ontherus pubens Génier, 1996
 Ontherus raptor Génier, 1996
 Ontherus rectangulidens Génier, 1996
 Ontherus rectus Génier, 1996
 Ontherus sanctaemartae Génier, 1996
 Ontherus sextuberculatus Génier, 1996
 Ontherus stridulator Génier, 1996
 Ontherus sulcator Fabricius, 1775
 Ontherus tenuistriatus Génier, 1996
 Ontherus trituberculatus Balthasar, 1938
 Ontherus ulcopygus Génier, 1996
 Ontherus virescens Lucas, 1859
 Ontherus zikani Luederwaldt, 1930

References

 

Scarabaeidae